Notable events of 2011 in webcomics.

Events
 Namco Bandai started subsidiary ShiftyLook, with the purpose to revive unused video game characters from the company's past with webcomics.
 International webcomic platform MangaMagazine.net, which later became Inkblazers, is founded by Victor Chu and Bancha Dhammarungruang.
 Dark Horse Comics releases Dark Horse Digital, an iOS app that functions as a digital store front for webcomics.

Awards

Eagle Awards, "Favourite Web-Based Comic" won by Ethan Nicolle and Malachai Nicolle's Axe Cop.
Eisner Awards, "Best Digital Comic" won by Karl Kerschl's Abominable Charles Christopher.
Harvey Awards, "Best Online Comics Work" won by Kate Beaton's Hark! A Vagrant.
Joe Shuster Award, "Outstanding Web Comics Creator(s)" won by Emily Carroll.
Ignatz Awards, "Outstanding Online Comic" won by Kate Beaton's Hark! A Vagrant.
Aurora Awards, "Best Graphic Novel" won by Tarol Hunt's Goblins.
Hugo Award for Best Graphic Story won by Kaja Foglio, Phil Foglio, and Cheyenne Wright's Girl Genius, Volume 10.

Webcomics started

 January 4 — Loading Artist by Gregor Czaykowski
 February 3 — Transmission by Mark Alexander Smith.
 February 14 — Battlepug by Mike Norton
 March 25 — Artifice by Alex Woolfson
 April 3 — Cucumber Quest by Gigi D.G.
 May 24 — Steroids 'n' Asteroids with Quadra Blu by Lyman Dally
 May 28 — Delilah Dirk and the Turkish Lieutenant by Tony Cliff
 June 2 — Dorris McComics by Alex Norris
 July — "Bongcheon-Dong Ghost" by Horang
 September — A Redtail's Dream by Minna Sundberg
 October — The Fox Sister by Christina Strain and Jayd Aït-Kaci
 November 1 — Gaia by Oliver Knörzer and Puri Andini
 November 26 — JL8 by Yale Stewart
 Bucko by Jeff Parker and Erika Moen
 Dr. Frost by Lee Jong-beom
 Fashion King by Kian84
 Gaus Electronics by Gwak Baek-soo
 Girls of the Wild's by Hun and Zhena (Kim Hye-jin)
 God of Bath by Ha Il-kwon
 Orange Marmalade by Seok Woo

Webcomics ended
 Digger by Ursula Vernon, 2003 – 2011
 The Phoenix Requiem by Sarah Ellerton, 2007 – 2011
 Hori-san to Miyamura-kun by HERO, 2007 – 2011
 FreakAngels by Warren Ellis and Paul Duffield, 2008 – 2011

References

 
Webcomics by year